A missa brevis is a shorter musical mass composition.

Missa brevis may also refer to:
 Kyrie–Gloria masses, BWV 233–236, masses by Johann Sebastian Bach
 Mass for the Dresden court (Bach), BWV 232 I (early version), composed in 1733 by Johann Sebastian Bach
 Missa in D minor, BR E2, Fk 98, a mass by Wilhelm Friedemann Bach
 Missa in G minor, BR E1, Fk 100, a mass by Wilhelm Friedemann Bach
 Missa super cantilena "Allein Gott in der Höh' sei Ehr", a mass by Johann Ludwig Bach
 Missa Brevis (Bernstein), a 1989 work by Leonard Bernstein
 Missa Brevis (Britten), a 1959 work by Benjamin Britten
 Missa brevis (Nystedt), a 1984 work by Knut Nystedt
 Missa Brevis (Palestrina), a 1570 work by Giovanni Pierluigi da Palestrina

See also
 Bach's church music in Latin#Separate movements, copies, and arrangements
 List of masses by Wolfgang Amadeus Mozart